The Creag-an-Arnain Viaduct is a railway viaduct that carries the West Highland Line.

History
The viaduct opened to traffic in 1894 as part of the West Highland Line between Glasgow and Fort William. It may have been designed by James Miller.

Design
It has a slight curve, and crosses two unnamed burns on the western shore of Loch Lomond.

It is the only conventional masonry viaduct on the West Highland line, many others being made of concrete. It was built of stone arches instead of lattice girders, as many railway bridges were at the time, to avoid contemporary criticism.

References

Railway bridges in Scotland
Category B listed buildings in Argyll and Bute
Listed bridges in Scotland
Bridges in Argyll and Bute
Bridges completed in 1894
1894 establishments in Scotland